Tevul Yom is a tractate in the Mishnah and Tosefta; in most editions of the Mishnah it is tenth in the order Tohorot. 

According to  et seq., one who takes the prescribed ritual immersion still remains impure until sunset. The degree of impurity in such a case is slight, and according to rabbinical interpretation neither the "ḥallah" nor sanctified flesh is rendered unclean by being touched by such a person, even before sunset; it is merely rendered unfit (pasul). Profane or unsanctified things may be touched by him without consequence. This tractate precisely defines the degree of impurity attaching to such a person, and stipulates also how far the purity of anything is affected by his touch.

Contents
In the Mishnah, the tractate comprises four chapters, containing 26 paragraphs in all:

 Chapter 1: Laws concerning bread and other things which are of such a form that if a tevul yom or any other uncleanness touches part of them the whole is rendered impure.

 Chapter 2: Concerning liquids touched by a tevul yom; when such contact renders the whole unfit, and when it affects only the part touched.

 Chapter 3: Continuation of chapter 2: laws concerning liquids easily rendered impure.

 Chapter 4: Laws concerning utensils touched by a tevul yom; enumeration of halakhic rules which have undergone changes in the course of time; of the halakhic regulations which R. Joshua declared were introduced by the sages ("soferim"), and which he was unable to explain.

In the Tosefta, the tractate is divided into two chapters.

References